Chyangba is a small village in Tapting municipality, Eastern Region of Nepal.

References

Populated places in Solukhumbu District